Automatic train operation (ATO) is a technology used to automate the operation of trains. The degree of automation is indicated by the Grade of Automation (GoA), up to GoA4 in which the train is automatically controlled without any staff on board. On most systems for lower grades of automation, there is a driver present to mitigate risks associated with failures or emergencies. Driverless automation is primarily used on automated guideway transit systems where it is easier to ensure the safety due to isolated track lines. Fully automated trains for mainline railways are an area of research.

Grades of automation 

According to the International Association of Public Transport (UITP) and the international standard IEC 62290‐1, there are five Grades of Automation (GoA) of trains. These levels correspond with the automotive SAE J3016 classification:

Additional types

History of train automation 

The first unmanned driving test on rail tracks was conducted in Berlin, Germany, in 1928 near the Krumme Lanke station. 

MP 51, the first prototype of Paris' rubber-tyred metro was fitted with GoA2 ATO from the start. It operated a quiet 770 m shuttle service with sharp turns and steep grades on la voie navette of the Paris Métro with passengers from 13 April 1952 until 31 May 1956. It featured a GoA2 system with an ATO "mat" fitted onto the underfloor of the train continuously in contact with a guide-line between the tracks nicknamed "Grecque", and often prompted passengers to "operate the train" by pushing the ATO start button. Lack of funds prevented installation on the rest of the Paris Metro until 1966, starting with line 11. Line 14, opened in 1998, was the first newly built Paris Métro to operate in GoA4, and Line 1 later also had its GoA2 ATO system replaced to a newer GoA4 CBTC system from 1972.

The Barcelona Metro's (old) line II (now L5) was the first metro line in the world to install a GoA2 photoelectric cell-based ATO system on an existing metro line and on its FMB 600 series rolling stock. This system was implemented in 1960–1961 and decommissioned in 1970. Currently, L9 (Europe's longest driverless line) and L10 run with GoA4 ATO, while L11 runs with GoA3.

A pilot for GoA2 ATO on the London Underground saw 1960 Stock trains fitted for ATO running along the Woodford to Hainault section of the Central Line from 1964 until 1986 when the trains were reverted to manual operation. The Victoria line opened in 1968 as the world's first newly built full-scale automatic railway and metro line and has since become the first to have an ATO system replaced. The full Central, Northern, and Jubilee lines have also been upgraded to run with ATO. The Circle, District, Hammersmith & City and Metropolitan lines are currently being modernised with a brand new automatic train control system.

The first line to be operated with Automatic Train Operation (ATO) was London Underground's Victoria line, which opened in 1967, although a driver is present in the cabin. Many lines now operate using an ATO system, with the aim of improving the frequency of service. Since then, ATO technology has been developed to enable trains to operate even without a driver in a cab: either with an attendant roaming within the train, or with no staff on board. The first fully automated driverless mass-transit rail network is the Port Island Line in Kobe, Japan. The second in the world (and the first such driverless system in Europe) is the Lille Metro in northern France.

The Teito Rapid Transit Authority (TRTA; now Tokyo Metro) piloted GoA2 ATO starting from 1962 on the Hibiya Line between Minami-Senju and Iriya, and subsequently expanded to the entire line in 1970. TRTA 3000 series set 3015 was the first train retrofitted with ATO running, while new trains ordered after 1963 were built-new with ATO. The pilot reportedly lasted until the end of 1987, after which the trains reverted to manual operation. The Hibiya Line pilot was then use as the basis for equipping the Namboku Line, opened in stages between 1991 and 2000, with GoA2 ATO. Sendai Subway Namboku Line, opened in 1987, was the first subway line in the world to use fuzzy logic, developed by Hitachi, to automate the operation of trains at GoA2 level, accounting for the relative smoothness of the starts and stops when compared to other systems at that time, and was stated to be 10% more energy efficient than human-controlled acceleration. Many subway and conventional railway lines in Japan use GoA2 ATO, in some implementations distinguishing the ATO systems' auto-acceleration function with the indigenously developed TASC auto-braking system, which the latter would theoretically still be able to function without driver input if the former malfunctions. Port Island Line and Rokkō Island Line of Kobe New Transit, opened in 1981 and 1990 respectively, as well as Disney Resort Line monorail of Tokyo Disney Resort, opened in 2001, use GoA 3(+), while people mover systems such as the Yurikamome line in Tokyo, opened in 1995, and the Linimo low-speed maglev line in Aichi Prefecture, opened in 2005, use GoA 4.

Busan Metro Line 1 was the first line in the Korean Peninsula to feature a GoA 2 ATO system upon its opening in 1985. This was followed by Seoul Subway Lines 5, 7 and 8 in 1996, Daegu Metro Line 1 in 1997, Incheon Subway Line 1 in 1999, Seoul Subway Line 6 in 2000. Gwangju Metro Line 1 in 2004 and Daejeon Metro Line 1 in 2006. Seoul Subway Line 2 introduced GoA 2 operation using an ATO system developed by Siemens in 2011. Currently, six Seoul Subway lines, three Busan Metro lines and all Daegu, Daejeon and Gwangju Metro lines, as well as the AREX and Seohae Line are operated with GoA 2 ATO, while Busan Metro Line 4, Gimpo Goldline, Incheon Airport Maglev, Incheon Subway Line 2, Shinbundang Line and U Line are operated using GoA 4 ATO.

This has since been extended south from Blackfriars to London Bridge. The Elizabeth line, which opened in 2022 as the central element of the Crossrail project, is equipped with the ATO-supported Siemens Trainguard MT CBTC on its core central section between London Paddington station and Abbey Wood railway station, while the branch to Heathrow Airport is fitted with ETCS Level 2 superimposed with ATO, as well as the section of the Great Western Main Line from Paddington to Heathrow Airport Junction overlaid on top of the existing TPWS and AWS safety systems.

German ICE high-speed lines equipped with the Linienzugbeeinflussung (LZB) signalling system support a form of GoA 2 ATO operation called AFB (Automatische Fahr- und Bremssteuerung, lit. automatic driving and braking control) which enables the driver to let the on-board train computer drive the train on autopilot, automatically driving at the maximum speed currently allowed by LZB signalling. In this mode, the driver only monitors the train and watches for unexpected obstacles on the tracks. On lines equipped with only PZB/Indusi, AFB acts entirely as a speed cruise control, driving according to the speed set by the driver with manual braking if needed.

CR400BF-C 'Fuxing Hao', a variant of CR400 Fuxing series, running on Beijing–Zhangjiakou intercity railway is said to be the world first high-speed rail service capable of driverless automation in commercial operations. The specific Grade of Automation (GoA) was not announced.

Operation of ATO 
Many modern systems are linked with automatic train protection (ATP) and, in many cases, automatic train control (ATC) where normal signaling operations such as route setting and train regulation are carried out by the system. The ATC and ATP systems will work together to maintain a train within a defined tolerance of its timetable. The combined system will marginally adjust operating parameters such as the ratio of power to coasting when moving and station dwell time in order to adhere to a defined timetable.

Whereas ATP is the safety system that ensures a safe spacing between trains and provides sufficient warning as to when to stop. ATO is the "non-safety" part of train operation related to station stops and starts, and indicates the stopping position for the train once the ATP has confirmed that the line is clear.

The train approaches the station under clear signals, so it can do a normal run-in. When it reaches the first beacon – originally a looped cable, now usually a fixed transponder – a station brake command is received by the train. The on-board computer calculates the braking curve to enable it to stop at the correct point, and as the train runs in towards the platform, the curve is updated a number of times (which varies from system to system) to ensure accuracy.

When the train has stopped, it verifies that its brakes are applied and checks that it has stopped within the door-enabling loops. These loops verify the position of the train relative to the platform and which side the doors should open. Once all this is complete, the ATO will open the doors. After a set time, predetermined or varied by the control centre as required, the ATO will close the doors and automatically restart the train if the door closed proving circuit is complete. Some systems have platform screen doors as well. ATO will also provide a signal for these to open once it has completed the on-board checking procedure. Although described here as an ATO function, door enabling at stations is often incorporated as part of the ATP equipment because it is regarded as a "vital" system and requires the same safety validation processes as ATP.

Once door operation is completed, ATO will accelerate the train to its cruising speed, allow it to coast to the next station brake command beacon and then brake into the next station, assuming no intervention by the ATP system.

Advantages of GoA3+ 
In 2021, the Florida Department of Transportation funded a review by scientists from Florida State University, University of Talca and Hong Kong Polytechnic University, which showed the following advantages of autonomous trains:
 Eliminating human sources of errors
 Increasing capacity by stronger utilisation of existing rail tracks
 Reduction of operational costs. Paris Métro reduced its operational costs in case of GoA 4 by 30%.
 Increasing overall service reliability
 Improving fleet management and service flexibility
 Increasing energy efficiency

Accidents and incidents involving ATO 
While ATO has been proven to drastically reduce the chance of human errors in railway operation, there have been a few notable accidents involving ATO systems:

ATO research projects

Standard systems for automated operation 
 Alstom
 Ansaldo STS
 AnsaldoBreda Driverless Metro
 Bombardier
 SelTrac
 Siemens
 VAL
 Bozankaya

Future 
In October 2021, the pilot project of the "world's first automated, driverless train" is launched in the city of Hamburg, Germany. The conventional, standard-track, non-metro train technology could, according to reports, theoretically be implemented for rail transport worldwide and is also substantially more energy efficient.

ATO will be introduced on the London Underground's Circle, District, Hammersmith & City, and Metropolitan lines by 2022. ATO will be used on parts of Crossrail once the route opens. Trains on the central London section of Thameslink were the first to use ATO on the UK mainline railway network with ETCS Level 2.

In April 2022, JR West announced that they will test ATO on a 12-car W7 series Shinkansen train used on the Hokuriku Shinkansen at the Hakusan General Rolling Stock Yard during 2022.

The U-Bahn in Vienna will be equipped with ATO in 2023 on the new U5 line.

All lines being built for the new Sydney Metro will feature driverless operation without any staff in attendance.

Since 2012, the Toronto subway has been undergoing signal upgrades in order to use ATO and ATC over the next decade. Work has been completed on sections Yonge–University line. The underground portion of Line 5 Eglinton will be equipped with ATC and ATO in 2022. The underground portion will use a GoA2 system while the Eglinton Maintenance and Storage Facility will use a GoA4 system and travel driverless around the yard. The Ontario Line is proposed have a GoA4 driverless system and will open in 2030.

Since March 2021, SNCF and Hauts-de-France region have begun an experimentation with a French Regio 2N Class, (fr).

See also 
 Automation of the London Underground
 Communications-based train control – A moving block signalling system that can be used to automate operation of trains
 One-person operation – A method of train operation, sometimes seen as an intermediate step towards greater automation
 Signaling of the New York City Subway#Automation
 Train automatic stopping controller – An automatic braking system used on some Japanese railway lines, can also be combined with ATO as its auto-braking function
 Vehicular automation
 Guided bus

References 

Emerging technologies
1967 in rail transport